Armando Vieira (born 11 April 1925) is a Brazilian retired tennis player. His best achievement was reaching quarterfinals of the 1951 Wimbledon Championships.

In June 1951 he won the singles title at the Dutch International Championships after defeating Felicisimo Ampon in the final in three straight sets. He won the Dixie International Championships on clay in 1956. Vieira turned professional in 1958.

References

External links

 
 
 
 Armando Vieira. wimbledon.com

1925 births
Living people|
Brazilian male tennis players
Professional tennis players before the Open Era
Tennis players from São Paulo